Panasonic Lumix DMC-SZ9 is a digital camera by Panasonic Lumix. The highest-resolution pictures it records is 16.6 megapixels, through its 25mm Ultra Wide Angle Leica DC VARIO-ELMAR.

Properties
10x optical zoom
Venus Engine
Creative Panorama mode
Full HD movies
Beauty Retouch with One-touch Make Up mode

References

Point-and-shoot cameras
SZ9